Matthew James Reed (born 24 December 1986) is an English former footballer who played as a goalkeeper.

Career
Reed began his career at West Ham United, playing for the club as a youth team player. In January 2006, Reed was loaned out to League Two club Barnet, making four appearances for the club during his time on loan.

Following his release from West Ham, Reed joined Bristol City, before leaving the club in September 2006. Following his spell at Bristol City, Reed joined Walton Casuals for the remainder of the season. In 2007, Reed signed for Tonbridge Angels, making 58 appearances in all competitions, before joining Sittingbourne the following year. In 2009, Reed briefly joined Carshalton, before signing for Margate in November 2009. After departing Margate in February 2010, Reed signed for Dartford as back-up. In the summer of 2010, Reed re-signed for Sittingbourne, making 40 league appearances in his second spell at the club. The following summer, Reed signed for Metropolitan Police, before rejoining Sittingbourne for a third spell in September 2011. In 2012, Reed signed for Leatherhead, making 12 league appearances throughout the 2012–13 season.

References

1986 births
Living people
Association football goalkeepers
English footballers
Sportspeople from Dartford
West Ham United F.C. players
Barnet F.C. players
Bristol City F.C. players
Walton Casuals F.C. players
Tonbridge Angels F.C. players
Sittingbourne F.C. players
Carshalton Athletic F.C. players
Margate F.C. players
Dartford F.C. players
Metropolitan Police F.C. players
Leatherhead F.C. players
English Football League players
Isthmian League players